David Freeman (born May 22, 1939) is a collector, historian, and authority on old-time and bluegrass music. Freeman started the County Records label in 1963 in his native New York to focus on Southern string band music, and began the companion mail-order record retail company County Sales in 1965.  He moved both businesses to Floyd, Virginia in 1974.  In 1977, Freeman started the Record Depot wholesale distribution company in Roanoke, Virginia, specializing in bluegrass and old-time music.  In 1978 he helped his graphic artist Barry Poss start a bluegrass music record label, Sugar Hill Records, in Durham, North Carolina.  In 1980, Freeman bought Charlottesville-based Rebel Records, a pioneering bluegrass label, from Charles Freeland, one of the label's founders.  Freeman was inducted into the International Bluegrass Music Hall of Honor in 2002.

See also
County Records
Rebel Records
Sugar Hill Records

References

External links
County Sales website

1939 births
Living people
Record producers from Virginia
American music historians
American male non-fiction writers
Record collectors
People from Floyd, Virginia
Historians from Virginia